Constantine most often refers to:
 Constantine the Great, Roman emperor from 306 to 337, also known as Constantine I
Constantine, Algeria, a city in Algeria
Constantine may also refer to:

People 

 Constantine (name), a masculine given name and surname

Roman/Byzantine emperors 

 Constantine II (emperor)
 Constantine III (Western Roman emperor)
 Constantine III (Byzantine emperor)
 Constantine IV
 Constantine V
 Constantine VI
 Constantine VII Porphyrogenitus
 Constantine VIII
 Constantine IX Monomachos
 Constantine X Doukas
 Constantine XI Palaiologos

Emperors not enumerated
Tiberius II, reigned officially as "Constantine"
Constans II, reigned officially as "Constantine"
Constantine (son of Leo V)
Constantine (son of Theophilos)
Constantine (son of Basil I)
Constantine Doukas (co-emperor)
Constantine Lekapenos
Constantine Laskaris (?)

Other rulers 

 Constantine I, Prince of Armenia
 Constantine II, Prince of Armenia
 Constantine I, King of Armenia, also called Constantine III
 Constantine II, King of Armenia, also called Constantine IV
 Constantine III, King of Armenia, also called Constantine V
 Constantine IV, King of Armenia, also called Constantine VI
 Constantine of Baberon, regent of Zabel, and father of Hetoum I of Armenia, 13th century
 Constantine I (or Kuestantinos I) of Ethiopia, also known as Zara Yaqob
 Constantine II (or Kuestantinos II) of Ethiopia, also known as Eskender
 Constantine I of Greece
 Constantine II of Greece
 Constantine I of Arborea
 Constantín mac Fergusa, or Constantin of the Picts
 Constantín mac Cináeda, or Constantine I of Scotland
 Constantine II of Scotland
 Constantine III of Scotland
 Constantine I of Cagliari
 Constantine II of Cagliari
 Constantine III of Gallura
 Constantine I of Torres
 Constantine Tikh of Bulgaria
 Grand Duke Constantine Pavlovich of Russia
 Constantine Dragaš
 Constantine I of Georgia
 Constantine II of Georgia
 Constantine I of Imereti
 Constantine Mavrocordatos
 Constantine Ypsilantis
 Constantine (Briton), king in sub-Roman Britain
 Constantine of Strathclyde, supposed king of Strathclyde

Religious leaders 
 Constantine I of Constantinople
 Constantine II of Constantinople
 Constantine III of Constantinople
 Constantine IV of Constantinople
 Constantine V of Constantinople
 Constantine VI of Constantinople
 Pope Constantine
 Antipope Constantine II

Other people 

 Constantine (British saint), several obscure saints
 Constantine of Preslav, a medieval Bulgarian scholar
 Constantine or Causantín, Earl of Fife (fl. 1095–1128), a Scottish nobleman
 Constantine Stilbes (fl. 1070–1220), a Byzantine clergyman and poet
 Constantine the African (c. 1020–1087), a Tunisian doctor
 Constantine the Jew (d. c. 886), Byzantine monk
 Constantine-Silvanus (also called Silvanus), founder of the Paulicians
 Saint Cyril the Philosopher, whose original name was Constantine

Fictional characters
 John Constantine, a fictional character appearing in DC Comics franchise, including Hellblazer
 Constantine (comic book), a comic book series replacing the earlier Hellblazer
 Constantine (film), a 2005 American film based on the DC Comic book character from the Hellblazer series
 Constantine (video game), an action-adventure video game based on the film
 Constantine (TV series), a 2014 NBC TV series, based on the comic book Hellblazer
 Constantine: City of Demons, a 2018 CW Seed animated web series
Constantine, the main antagonist of the film Muppets Most Wanted

Places

Algeria 

 Constantine, Algeria, the nation's third largest city and capital of Constantine Province
 Constantine Province, surrounding the city of the same name
Beylik of Constantine, an administrative unit of the Regency of Algiers
 Constantine (departement), similar area during French Algeria

Serbia

 Constantine the Great Airport, Niš, Serbia

Switzerland 

 Constantine, Switzerland, a municipality in the canton of Vaud

United Kingdom 

 Constantine Bay, near Padstow, Cornwall
 Constantine, Cornwall, near Falmouth
 Constantine College, York, a college of the University of York

United States 

 Constantine, Michigan, a village in St. Joseph county

Other uses 
 Order of Constantine
 Constantine (album), a 2007 album by Constantine Maroulis
 Constantine, a 2020 album by 40 Glocc
 Constantine, a frog character who resembles Kermit the Frog and is the foremost criminal in the 2014 film Muppets Most Wanted

See also 

 Constantin (disambiguation)
 Constantines, indie rock band
 Constantius (disambiguation)